The 2013 Toulon Tournament was the 41st edition of the Toulon Tournament. México were the defending champions but failed to secure a spot in the finals.

Participants

 (hosts)

Squads

Venues

Results
All times are local (UTC+2).

Group A

Group B

Third place play-off

Final

Goal scorers
3 goals

 Vinícius Araújo
 José Abella
 Aladje

2 goals

 Yuri Mamute
 Jherson Vergara
 Miguel Borja
 Paul Madiba
 Alhaji Gero

1 goal

 Zakaria Bakkali
 Paul-José M'Poku
 Igor Vetokele
 Danilo
 Erik Lima
 Felipe Aguilar
 Cristian Palomeque
 Andrés Rentería
 Harrison Manzala
 Stéphane Bahoken
 Alexandre Coeff
 Rachid Ghezzal
 Gilbert Imbula
 Benjamin Jeannot
 Paul Madiba
 Gaël Vena
 Jo Suk-jae
 Han Sung-gyu
 Kang Yoon-goo
 Marco Bueno
 Julio Morales
 Armando Zamorano
 Bright Ejike
 Ricardo Alves
 Ivan Cavaleiro
 Ricardo Esgaio
 Ricardo Pereira
 Tozé
 Daniel Cuevas
 Danny Garcia
 Benji Joya

Final standings

References

External links
Toulon Tournament

 
2013

Toulon Tournament
Toulon Tournament
Toulon Tournament
Toulon Tournament